The 2004 Bahraini Crown Prince Cup was the 4th edition of the cup tournament in men's football (soccer). This edition featured the top four sides from the Bahraini Premier League 2003-04 season.

Bracket

Bahraini Crown Prince Cup seasons
2004 domestic association football cups
2003–04 in Bahraini football